Mehdi Aidet (born 3 November 1953) represented Algeria in the 800 m and the  1500 mat the 1980 Summer Olympic Games he qualified for the next round in both events before being eliminated, he then went on to compete in the 1500 mat the 1984 Summer Olympic Games.

He was a National Champion three times in the 800m and 5 times in the 1500m, he also represented Algeria at the 1980 IAAF World Cross Country Championships, 1981 IAAF World Cross Country Championships and 1982 IAAF World Cross Country Championships, his best finish was 60th in 1980.

References

Athletes (track and field) at the 1980 Summer Olympics
Athletes (track and field) at the 1984 Summer Olympics
Olympic athletes of Algeria
Athletes (track and field) at the 1979 Mediterranean Games
Algerian male long-distance runners
1953 births
Living people
Mediterranean Games competitors for Algeria
21st-century Algerian people
20th-century Algerian people